Bartolomeu Perestrello (in Italian Bartolomeo Perestrello), 1st Capitão Donatário, Lord and Governor of the Island of Porto Santo ( 1395 – 1457) was a Portuguese navigator and explorer that is claimed to have discovered and populated Porto Santo Island (1419) together with João Gonçalves Zarco and Tristão Vaz Teixeira. The account of his participation in the discovery is disputed by some historians.

Biography 
He was a son of Micer Filippo Pallastrelli (called Filipe Perestrello in Portugal), a Lombard knight who came to Portugal some say erroneously in the train of Queen Leonor of Aragon and here he was a Nobleman of John I of Portugal, who recognized his Coat of Arms and made him a Nobleman of Coat of Arms in 1433; he was married to Caterina Visconti (of the Visconti of Verona not from the ones of Milan), with whom he came to Portugal in 1385, and granted, in 1437, two houses at the Sub-Ripas Street in the City of Coimbra. He was the son of Micer Gabriele Pallastrelli, a Lombard nobleman from Piacenza, and second wife Bertolina Bracciforti.
Nobleman and Fidalgo-Esquire of the House of Infante João, Lord of Reguengos and master of the Portuguese Order of Saint James (Santiago), he was granted in 1446, as a hereditary fief (capitania), the island of Porto Santo and, together with his fellow fleet commanders, started the colonization of the islands.

One of his daughters, Filipa Moniz Perestrelo (born c. 1455), around 1479 married Christopher Columbus, who lived in Madeira and Porto Santo.

A legend attributes the responsibility for the poor vegetation of Porto Santo to him. On his first disembarkation in the island he brought one pregnant doe-rabbit that escaped and its progeny overran the island in a few years. In fact, the island was poor in water, and what seemed to be a good enterprise for him became the cause of his family financial ruin.

Family 

He married four times, firstly to Margarida Martins, without known issue, secondly with Branca Dias, fathering Branca Dias Perestrello, lady-in-waiting to Eleanor of Aragon, Queen of Portugal, and mistress of Dom Pedro de Noronha (Castle of Gijón, 1379 – August 20, 1452), 4th Archbishop of Lisbon (1424–1452), by whom she had issue, including D. Pedro de Noronha, Lord Chamberlain to King John II of Portugal. Thirdly in 1446 to Brites Furtado de Mendonça, (aunt of King John II's mistress Ana de Mendonça) and had issue including Izeu Perestrelo, wife of Pedro Correia, First Captain of Graciosa Island in the Azores and one of King John II's twenty-five bodyguards. His fourth marriage to Isabel Moniz also had issue, including Filipa, one of the 12 Comendadoras of Santiago, who married Columbus, Violante who married Miguel Molyarte and lived in Seville, Spain and Bartolomeu Perestrelo II, Third Captain of Porto Santo.

He was the brother of Rafael Perestrello, head of the Perestrellos of Torres Vedras. He also had two sisters: Catarina Perestrello, married to Aires Anes de Beja, Escrivão da Puridade (a Secretary) of John I of Portugal.

See also 
Rafael Perestrello

References

Further reading 
 
 
 

15th-century explorers
15th-century Portuguese people
1390s births
1457 deaths
History of Madeira
Maritime history of Portugal
Portuguese explorers
People from Porto Santo
Portuguese people of Italian descent